The men's shot put at the 2012 IAAF World Indoor Championships took place March 9 at the Ataköy Athletics Arena.

Medalists

Records

Qualification standards

Schedule

Results

Qualification

Qualification standard: 20.70 m (Q) or at least best 8 qualified (q).  23 athletes from 20 countries participated.  The qualification round started at 09:54 and ended at 11:04.

Final

8 athletes from 6 countries participated.  The final started at 19:54 and ended at 20:04.

References

Shot Put
Shot put at the World Athletics Indoor Championships